Fritz Büchtger (14 February 1903 – 26 December 1978) was a German composer.

Life 

Under the direction of Büchtger and the conductor Hermann Scherchen (1891-1966), who acted as the spiritual leader, this institution held four "Festwochen für Neue Musik" in particular until its end in 1932, in addition to the large number of individual concerts.

In 1948 Büchtger became director of the Studio for New Music and the Youth Music School in Munich. Since 1963 he was president of the German section of Jeunesses Musicales International. In the three decades after the Second World War, he organized ten music festivals and about seven hundred concerts, presenting two thousand eight hundred works of modern music.

In addition to an opera, an orchestral concerto and a violin concerto, Büchtger composed three sacred oratorios, church cantatas, Marian hymns, choral music and song cycles.

He received the Schwabing Art Prize in 1977.

Büchtger died in Starnberg at age 75. His grave is located at the Munich Waldfriedhof.

Publications 
 Petite sonate : pour violoncelle et piano.
 Die Himmelfahrt Christi : für gemischten Chor und Orchester.
 Fritz Büchtger.
 Le miroir brisé : 4 chansons d'amour.
 Die Verklärung : für Bariton, Frauenstimmen und Streicher : Partitur zugleich Klavierauszug.

External links 
 
 
 Gabriele E. Meyer: Neue Musik-Wochen in München, 1929-1931 Gründung der "Vereinigung für zeitgenössische Musik"  Im: BLO (Historisches Lexikon Bayerns)

References 

20th-century classical composers
20th-century German composers
Officers Crosses of the Order of Merit of the Federal Republic of Germany
1903 births
1978 deaths
Musicians from Munich
Burials at Munich Waldfriedhof